Elissavet Pantazi (born 21 May 1956) is a Greek hurdler. She competed in the women's 100 metres hurdles at the 1984 Summer Olympics.

References

1956 births
Living people
Athletes (track and field) at the 1984 Summer Olympics
Greek female hurdlers
Olympic athletes of Greece
Place of birth missing (living people)
Mediterranean Games medalists in athletics
Athletes (track and field) at the 1979 Mediterranean Games
Athletes (track and field) at the 1983 Mediterranean Games
Mediterranean Games silver medalists for Greece
Mediterranean Games bronze medalists for Greece